= Chełszcząca =

River in Poland

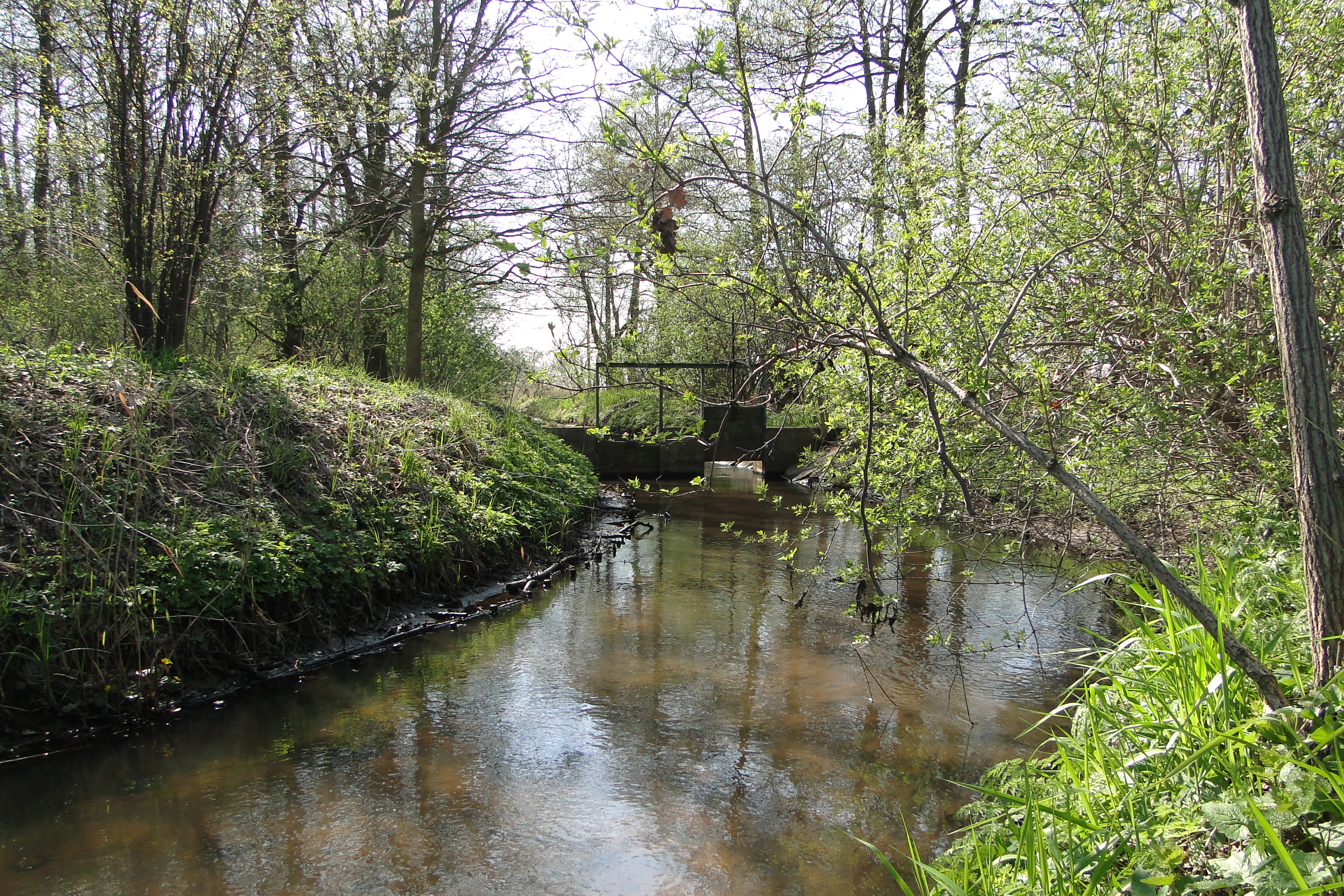

Location
- Country: Poland
- Voivodeship: West Pomeranian Voivodeship

Physical characteristics
- Source
  - location: south of the Szczecin district of Sławociesze
  - coordinates: 53°24′27″N 14°39′57″E
- Mouth: Lake Dąbie
  - location: Szczecin
  - coordinates: 53°24′27″N 14°39′57″E
- Length: approx. 11 km

Chełszcząca (Flossgraben until 1945) is a small stream in the West Pomeranian Voivodeship of north-western Poland. It is approximately 11 km long, of which about 10 km lies within the city limits of Szczecin.

The river originates on the edge of the Goleniowska Forest, at the boundary between the municipality of Kobylanka (Stargard County) and the Szczecin district of Sławociesze. Due to its close proximity to the Płonia River, the Chełszcząca periodically receives part of its waters. During high water levels, water is transferred in a controlled manner through a connecting weir. In cases of exceptionally high water levels, uncontrolled overflow from the Płonia into the headwaters of the Chełszcząca may occur.

The stream flows northwest as far as the Cieszyce district, then turns west. It flows around the Dąbie district from the east and north. In Cieszyce it receives its main left tributary, the Żołnierska Struga. It flows into Lake Dąbie below Jeziorna Street in Szczecin.

Many publications incorrectly describe the Chełszcząca as one of the distributaries of the Płonia River, which is not accurate.
